Herbinghen is a commune in the Pas-de-Calais department in the Hauts-de-France region of France.

Geography
A small farming village located 13 miles (19 km) south of Calais, at the junction of the D224 and D191 roads.

Population

Places of interest
 The church of St. Riquier, rebuilt in the 19th century.

See also
Communes of the Pas-de-Calais department

References

External links

 Statistical data, INSEE

Communes of Pas-de-Calais
Artois